Tseung Kwan O Sports Ground, located in Tseung Kwan O, Hong Kong, is a multi-purpose sports ground and home of Hong Kong Premier League club Eastern. It was the main venue for track and field events for the 2009 Hong Kong Games, 2009 East Asian Games and 2011 Hong Kong Games. 

Occupying an area of about 5.9 hectares, it comprises a main sports ground, a warm-up secondary sports ground, and other facilities for holding large-scale international competitions. Its track and field facilities conform to International Association of Athletics Federations standards. It is located adjacent to the Hong Kong Velodrome.

Opening
It was officially opened on 19 May 2009 with celebrating the 200-day countdown to the opening of the 2009 East Asian Games.

Events held
 2009 Hong Kong Games Opening ceremony and track and field event.
 2009 East Asian Games track and field event.
 2011 Hong Kong Games track and field event.

Facilities

Facilities of the main sports ground include:
 Eight-lane 400-metre all-weather synthetic running track, in a unique green colour
 Javelin-throw circle
 High jump take-off runways and pits
 Long jump and triple jump runways and pits
 Pole-vault runway and landing area
 Steeple chase facilities
 Hammer and discus cage
 Shot-put throwing area
 11-a-side natural football pitch conforming to FIFA standards
 Covered spectator stand with a seating capacity of about 3,500 and spaces for a temporary spectator stand with 1,500 seats.

Secondary sports ground
The secondary sports ground includes:
 Warm-up track and field facilities
 Seven-a-side natural turf football pitch

Ancillary facilities

Other ancillary facilities include: 
 Doping control rooms
 Weight-lifting rooms
 Control rooms
 Press facilities
 Necessary facilities for organising events and conferences as well as holding training exercises.

Gallery

References

External links

Leisure and Cultural Services Department - Tseung Kwan O Sports Ground
Tseung Kwan O sports ground to be world-class
Ground breaking ceremony

Tseung Kwan O
Sports venues in Hong Kong
Football venues in Hong Kong
2009 establishments in Hong Kong